These are the list of results that England have played from 2000 to 2009.

2000 
Scores and results list England's points tally first.

80.00% winning rate for 2000

2001 
Scores and results list England's points tally first.

90.91% winning rate for 2001

2002 
Scores and results list England's points tally first.

88.89% winning rate for 2002

2003 
Scores and results list England's points tally first.

94.12% winning rate for 2003

2004 
Scores and results list England's points tally first.

45.45% winning rate for 2004

2005 
Scores and results list England's points tally first.

50% winning rate for 2005

2006 
Scores and results list England's points tally first.

27.3% winning rate for 2006

2007 
Scores and results list England's points tally first.

52.9% winning rate for 2007

2008 
Scores and results list England's points tally first.

36.3% winning rate for 2008

2009 
Scores and results list England's points tally first.

50% winning rate for 2009

Year Box 

2000–09
1999–2000 in English rugby union
2000–01 in English rugby union
2001–02 in English rugby union
2002–03 in English rugby union
2003–04 in English rugby union
2004–05 in English rugby union
2005–06 in English rugby union
2006–07 in English rugby union
2007–08 in English rugby union
2008–09 in English rugby union